The fifth series of the British medical drama television series Holby City commenced airing in the United Kingdom on BBC One on 8 October 2002, and concluded on 30 September 2003.

Cast

Main characters 
Ian Aspinall as Mubbs Hussein
Luisa Bradshaw-White as Lisa Fox
Peter de Jersey as Steve Waring (until episode 31)

Tina Hobley as Chrissie Williams
Verona Joseph as Jess Griffin
Denis Lawson as Tom Campbell-Gore
Art Malik as Zubin Khan (from episode 37)
Rocky Marshall as Ed Keating

Mark Moraghan as Owen Davis
David Paisley as Ben Saunders (until episode 29)
Jan Pearson as Kath Fox
Patricia Potter as Diane Lloyd
Hugh Quarshie as Ric Griffin
Laura Sadler as Sandy Harper (until episode 48)
Jeremy Sheffield as Alex Adams (until episode 45)
Kim Vithana as Rosie Sattar (from episode 32)

Recurring characters 
Liam Garrigan as Nic Yorke (from episode 36)
Rachel Leskovac as Kelly Yorke (from episode 39)
Andrew Lewis as Paul Rose

Episodes

Notes

References

05
2002 British television seasons
2003 British television seasons